The Bhujimol script (or Bhujinmol, Devanagari:  or ) is the most ancient form of Nepal script. It is also one of the most common varieties of the Nepal alphabet.

The Bhujimol script has been used to write Nepal Bhasa and Sanskrit.

Etymology

The term Bhujinmol means "fly-headed", from the Nepal Bhasa words "bhujin", meaning "housefly", and "mol", meaning "head". The "head" is the horizontal line that is put above each letter, and Bhujimol refers to its rounded shape.

Characteristics

Recent findings
In 2003, a brick was discovered in Chabahil, in the course of reconstruction of the Chabahil Stupa or Dhando Chaitya, bearing inscriptions in both Brahmi and Bhujimol: The upper face is inscribed with Cha Ru Wa Ti in Brahmi, and with  Cha Ru Wa Ti Dhande / He Tu Pra Bha in Bhujimol script. There are Swastika marks at the two ends of the upper face with a Chakra mark in between. The brick measures 35.5cm x 23cm x 7cm and weighs 8.6kg. The brick may date to as early as the 3rd century BC. 

The previously earliest known inscription in the Kathmandu Valley dates from the 6th century and is installed at Changu Narayan. The inscription is interpreted to refer to Charumati, a daughter of emperor Ashoka.

References 

Alphabets
Nepalese culture
Newar
Writing systems of Newar language